The Great Jesse James Raid is a 1953 American Ansco Color Western film directed by Reginald LeBorg and starring Willard Parker, Barbara Payton, and Tom Neal. This was the only film for Tom Neal and Barbara Payton to co-star together, as their ill-famed love affair essentially derailed the movie careers of both of them.

The film marked the production debut of Robert L. Lippert's son.

Plot
Famous outlaw and bank robber Jesse James is lured from his comfortable retirement in St. Joseph, Missouri, to commit one more robbery to retrieve gold from an abandoned mine in Colorado, but the affair will go wrong.

Cast  
Willard Parker as Jesse James
Barbara Payton as Kate
Tom Neal as Arch Clements
Wallace Ford as Elias Hobbs
Jim Bannon	as Bob Ford
James Anderson as Johnny Dorette
Richard H. Cutting as Sam Wells
Barbara Woodell as Zee James

References

External links

1953 films
American Western (genre) films
Films directed by Reginald Le Borg
Biographical films about Jesse James
1953 Western (genre) films
Lippert Pictures films
1950s English-language films
1950s American films